Karen Andrea Araya Ponce (born 16 October 1990) is a Chilean professional footballer who plays as a midfielder for Spanish Liga F club Madrid CFF and the Chile women's national team.

Club career
In 2022, Araya returned to Sevilla after her step in 2018–19 season.

On second half 2022, she switched to Madrid CFF in the same division.

Personal life
Her younger brother, Bernardo, is a futsal player who has played for clubs in both Argentina and France and has been the Chile team captain.

Career statistics
Scores and results list Chile's goal tally first, score column indicates score after each Araya goal.

References

External links

Profile at Txapeldunak.com 

1990 births
Living people
People from Puente Alto
Chilean women's footballers
Women's association football midfielders
Unión La Calera footballers
Colo-Colo (women) footballers
Santiago Morning (women) footballers
Grêmio Osasco Audax Esporte Clube players
Sevilla FC (women) players
Madrid CFF players
Primera División (women) players
Chile women's international footballers
2019 FIFA Women's World Cup players
Olympic footballers of Chile
Footballers at the 2020 Summer Olympics
Chilean expatriate women's footballers
Chilean expatriate sportspeople in Brazil
Expatriate women's footballers in Brazil
Chilean expatriate sportspeople in Spain
Expatriate women's footballers in Spain
Footballers from Santiago